Our Secret ( is a 2021 Chinese television drama starring Chen Zheyuan and Xu Mengjie. It is based on the Chinese novel Secrets in the Lattice. The series aired on Mango TV from August 10 until August 26, 2021.

Synopsis
The series tells the story of a superior and unruly campus male god Zhou Siyue (Chen Zheyuan) and a headstrong, stubborn and lovely cinderella girl, Ding Xian (Xu Mengjie). From being mutually exclusive tablemates at school to becoming each others lifelong companions in their journey through youth. Although they couldn't stand each other at first, they come to appreciate each other's strengths in their day-to-day interactions.

Cast and characters

Main 
 Chen Zheyuan as Zhou Siyue 
 Xu Mengjie as Ding Xian

Supporting 
 Wang Zexuan as Song Ziqi
 Wang Yilan as Kong Shadi
 Fan Zixhin as Su Bocong
 Liu Zhiwei as You Keke
 Li Riyao as Jiang Chen

Original soundtrack

Our Secret: Original soundtrack 

The drama soundtrack's is compiled in one album that consist of five songs. It was released on August 10, 2021 on various  music platform.

Awards and nominations

International broadcast 
  South Korea – CNTV  (January 8, 2022 - February 19, 2022)
  Vietnam – DNPT  (November 2022)

References

External links
 
 

Chinese television shows
2021 Chinese television series debuts
2021 Chinese television series endings
Chinese novels adapted into television series
Chinese romance television series
Mango TV original programming